Dream of You, is a studio album by Helen Merrill, which was arranged and conducted by Gil Evans. This recording immediately preceded Miles Ahead, Evans' collaboration with Miles Davis. In 1987, Merrill and Evans reunited to record new versions of the same songs for the album Collaboration. The CD reissue of Dream of You includes additional tracks.

Reception

The AllMusic review by Stephen Cook stated: "On 1955's Dream of You ... Merrill found reconciliation, sounding both melodramatic and swinging within Gil Evans' darkly spacious, yet economical arrangements. Suitably, torchy ballads are prominent. ... The programmatic quality of Merrill's coyly sensual voice and Evans' slightly askew, bubbling reeds and languid rhythm conjure up dramatic, balmy southern scenes á la Tennessee Williams."

Track listing
 "People Will Say We're in Love" (Oscar Hammerstein II, Richard Rodgers) - 2:34
 "By Myself" (Howard Dietz, Arthur Schwartz) - 3:23
 "Any Place I Hang My Hat Is Home" (Harold Arlen, Johnny Mercer) - 4:10
 "I've Never Seen" (Don Marcotte) - 3:33
 "He Was Too Good to Me" (Lorenz Hart, Rodgers) - 3:01
 "A New Town Is a Blue Town" (Richard Adler, Jerry Ross) - 3:09
 "You're Lucky to Me" (Eubie Blake, Andy Razaf) - 3:25
 "Where Flamingos Fly" (John Benson Brooks, Harold Courlander, Elthea Peale) - 2:44
 "Dream of You" (Jimmie Lunceford, Michael Morales, Sy Oliver) - 2:53
 "I'm a Fool to Want You" (Frank Sinatra, Joel Herron, Jack Wolf) - 4:06
 "I'm Just a Lucky So and So" (Mack David, Duke Ellington) - 3:08
 "Troubled Waters" (Sam Coslow, Arthur Johnston) - 3:14
1992 bonus tracks
 "Alone Together" (Master Take) (Dietz, Schwartz) - 3:11
 "Alone Together" (Alternate Take) - 3:10
 "Glad to Be Unhappy" (Hart, Rodgers) - 2:50
 "This Is My Night Cry" (Bill Sanford, Phil Medley) - 3:06
 "How's the World Treating You?" (Alternate Take) (Boudleaux Bryant, Chet Atkins) - 2:57
 "How's the World Treating You?" (Master Take) - 2:56

Personnel
Helen Merrill - vocals
Gil Evans - arranger, conductor
John LaPorta - clarinet, alto saxophone
Jerome Richardson - flute, alto saxophone, tenor saxophone
Danny Bank - baritone saxophone
Art Farmer, Louis Mucci - trumpet
Jimmy Cleveland, Joe Bennett - trombone
Hank Jones - piano
Janet Putnam - harp
Barry Galbraith - guitar
Oscar Pettiford - double bass
Joe Morello - drums

Production
Bob Shad - producer
1992 Reissue
Michael Lang - supervisor
Will Friedwald - music research
Kiyoshi "Boxman" Koyama - tape research
Andrew Nicholas - remastering
Peter Pullman - liner notes
Cliff Preiss - additional production assistant

References

EmArcy Records albums
Helen Merrill albums
Albums arranged by Gil Evans
Albums conducted by Gil Evans
Albums produced by Bob Shad
1957 albums